"Your Memory" is a song written by Charles Quillen and John Schweers, and recorded by American country music artist Steve Wariner.  It was released in November 1980 as the first single from the album Steve Wariner.  The song reached number 7 on the Billboard Hot Country Singles & Tracks chart.

Content
The song was one of the first collaborations between Charles Quillen and John Schweers, two Nashville-based songwriters. It is composed in the key of E major, with a main chord pattern of E-Bm-E-AM7-Am6-E-Fm-B.

Chart performance

References

1980 singles
1980 songs
Steve Wariner songs
RCA Records singles
Songs written by Charles Quillen
Songs written by John Schweers
Song recordings produced by Tom Collins (record producer)